Johannes Aigner (born 29 April 2005) is an Austrian visually impaired para alpine skier. He won five medals, including two gold medals, at the 2022 Winter Paralympics.

Career
Aigner made his debut at the 2021 World Para Snow Sports Championships where he won gold medals in the slalom, and parallel event, and silver medals in the super-g and giant slalom events.

Aigner competed at the 2022 Winter Paralympics and won gold medals in the downhill and giant slalom, silver medals in the super combined and slalom and a bronze medal in the Super-G.

Personal life
Aigner's twin sister, Barbara, and older sister Veronika are both visually impaired para skiers.

References 

2005 births
Living people
Austrian male alpine skiers
Alpine skiers at the 2022 Winter Paralympics
Medalists at the 2022 Winter Paralympics
Paralympic gold medalists for Austria
Paralympic silver medalists for Austria
Paralympic bronze medalists for Austria
Paralympic medalists in alpine skiing
Visually impaired category Paralympic competitors
Austrian blind people
Austrian twins
21st-century Austrian people